Psalmodia Choir is a choir formed in 1988 by Włodzimierz Siedlik at the Liturgy Institute of the Pontifical Academy of Theology in Kraków, Poland. In 1996 it was officially recognised as the choir of the Academy, and it is now the choir of the Pontifical University of John Paul II following the granting of university status to the Academy in 2009. Since 2001 the choir has included students from other faculties and from other universities in Kraków.

As well as performing works by composers from many countries across all epochs, Psalmodia Choir specialises in the music of contemporary Polish composers including Górecki, Penderecki and Wojciech Kilar. The choir usually sings a cappella, but has also performed vocal-instrumental works.

Psalmodia Choir has performed with the Polish Radio Choir in Kraków, presented the Johann Strauss operetta The Gypsy Baron with Opera Krakowska at the 12th Summer Opera Festival in Kraków in June 2008, and has appeared on Polish television. The choir prepared the musical setting for the Holy Mass liturgy during the papal pilgrimages to Kraków in 1991, 1997, 1999, 2002, and 2006. It was awarded first prize in the "mixed choirs" category at the 4th Choral Festival "Cantate Domino" in Kraków in May 2009.

References 
 

Polish choirs
Musical groups established in 1988